Indeera Gallage (born 30 April 1994) is a Sri Lankan cricketer. He made his first-class debut for Galle Cricket Club in Tier B of the 2017–18 Premier League Tournament on 12 January 2018.

References

External links
 

1994 births
Living people
Sri Lankan cricketers
Galle Cricket Club cricketers
People from Galle